Hai Ngoc Tran (born 10 January 1975) is a Norwegian former footballer who played at both professional and international levels as a defender.

Early and personal life
Born in Hanoi, North Vietnam, Tran came to Norway as a refugee in 1982.

Club career
He played professionally in Norway for Kongsvinger and Vålerenga.

International career
Tran was a youth international for Norway, and participated for Norway at the 1993 FIFA World Youth Championship. He earned one cap for the senior team in 1999.

References

1975 births
Living people
Norwegian footballers
Norway international footballers
Norway youth international footballers
Norway under-21 international footballers
Kongsvinger IL Toppfotball players
Vålerenga Fotball players
Eliteserien players
Vietnamese emigrants to Norway
Sportspeople of Vietnamese descent
Sportspeople from Hanoi
Association football defenders